Cyrus Adams Sulloway (June 8, 1839, Grafton, New Hampshire – March 11, 1917) was an attorney and   Republican member of the United States House of Representatives from New Hampshire.

Biography
Sulloway studied law and was admitted to the bar in 1863.

Sulloway served as a member of the New Hampshire House of Representatives from 1873 to 1878.

Sulloway served in the United States House of Representatives from March 4, 1895, to March 3, 1913, and from March 4, 1915, until his death in Washington, D.C.. In his 1896 reelection he won with a majority of 11,733.

See also

List of United States Congress members who died in office (1900–49)

Notes

References

External links
 
 Cyrus A. Sulloway, late a representative from New Hampshire, Memorial addresses delivered in the House of Representatives and Senate frontispiece 1917

1839 births
1917 deaths
People from Grafton, New Hampshire
New Hampshire lawyers
Republican Party members of the New Hampshire House of Representatives
Republican Party members of the United States House of Representatives from New Hampshire
19th-century American politicians
19th-century American lawyers